The 2015–16 BVIFA National Football League was the sixth season of the competition. The champions were Sugar Boys, who beat the four-time defending champions, Islanders FC 2–0 in the final.

Table

Group A

Group B

Knockout Tournament

External links 
 Summary of Results

BVIFA National Football League seasons
British Virgin Islands
football
football